Kwinti is an English-based creole of Suriname closely related to Ndyuka. The language has less than 300 speakers, and split from Plantation Creole which is nowadays known as Sranan Tongo in the middle 18th century. Code-switching with Sranan Tongo and Dutch was common among the younger generation in 1973, and about 70% of the tribe have moved to the urban areas. UNESCO considers the language endangered.

In the 1970s, Jan English-Lueck collected a vocabulary of 500 words. Unlike the Ndyuka languages, the letter r is spoken in a similar way to Sranan Tongo and Dutch, although speakers without r have been discovered later. About three quarters of the words were cognate to Sranan Tongo, very few (circa 3%) were cognate to Matawai, and about 17% were not found in the other creoles and mainly originated from Dutch. The differences can be explained by education, because according to a 2011 study the population of Witagron had a good command of both Dutch and Sranan Tongo.

References

Bibliography 
 
 
 Hoogbergen, Wim (1992). Origins of the Suriname Kwinti Maroons, New West Indian Guide / Nieuwe West-Indische Gids 66, no: 1/2, Leiden, 27–59, KITLV. Green, E.C., The Matawai Maroons: An Acculturating Afro American Society,  PhD. dissertation, Washington, D.C.: Catholic University of America, 1974.

Ndyuka language
Languages of Suriname
English-based pidgins and creoles
Creoles of the Americas
English language in the Americas